The tiang (Damaliscus lunatus tiang) is a subspecies of the topi, an African antelope. 

Depending on which topi populations you want to call tiang, they may be found in southern Chad, the northern Central African Republic, and southwestern South Sudan to southwestern Ethiopia, and extreme northwestern Kenya, or Uganda, South Sudan and Ethiopia.

References

Alcelaphinae
Bovids of Africa